The 2016–17 Primera B de Chile, known as the 2016–17 Campeonato Loto for sponsorship purposes, was the 63rd season of Chile's second-flight football. The competition began on July 31, 2016 and ended on April 30, 2017.

Participating teams

Stadia and locations

Aggregate table

See also
 2016–17 Chilean Primera División season
 2016–17 Segunda División Profesional de Chile

References

External links
Second Division - RSSSF

Primera B de Chile seasons
Primera B
Chil
Chil